Kalimuthu is a Tamil name and may refer to

K. Kalimuthu, Indian politician.
P. Kalimuthu, Malaysian gangster.
Mathavakannan Kalimuthu, Singaporean ex-convict.

Indian masculine given names